Ormond Pursuivant of Arms in Ordinary (also spelt Ormonde) is a current Scottish pursuivant of arms in Ordinary of the Court of the Lord Lyon.

The office was probably instituted around the same time as the creation of James Stewart, second son of James III of Scotland, as Marquess of Ormonde in 1476. There is a mention of Ormond being sent with letters to the Earl of Angus in 1488.

The badge of office is A mullet gyronny of ten Or and Gules five fleur-de-lys Gules in the angles between the points surmounted of a coronet of four fleur de-lys (two visible) and four crosses pattée (one and two-halves visible) Or.

The office is currently held by John Stirling, WS.

Holders of the office

See also
Officer of Arms
Pursuivant
Court of the Lord Lyon
Heraldry Society of Scotland

References

External links
 The Court of the Lord Lyon



Court of the Lord Lyon
Offices of arms